Tangerang Wolves Football Club was an Indonesian football club based in Tangerang, Banten. The team played in the Liga Primer Indonesia.

Current squad

References

External links
Tangerang FC at ligaprimerindonesia.co.id

Defunct football clubs in Indonesia
Football clubs in Indonesia
Association football clubs established in 2010
2010 establishments in Indonesia
Association football clubs disestablished in 2011
2011 disestablishments in Indonesia